The 28th Battalion (Northwest), CEF was an infantry battalion of the Canadian Expeditionary Force during the Great War.

History 
The battalion was authorized on 7 November 1914 and embarked for Britain on 29 May 1915. It disembarked in France on 18 September 1915, where it fought as part of the 6th Infantry Brigade, 2nd Canadian Division, in France and Flanders until the end of the war. The battalion was disbanded on 30 August 1920.

The 28th Battalion originally recruited in Saskatoon, Regina, Moose Jaw and Prince Albert, Saskatchewan and Fort William and Port Arthur (now Thunder Bay), Ontario and was mobilized at Winnipeg, Manitoba.

The battalion had five officers commanding:

Lieutenant-Colonel J.F.L. Embury, CMG, 29 May 1915 – 17 September 1916
Lieutenant-Colonel A. Ross, DSO, 17 September 1916 – 1 October 1918
Major G.F.D. Bond, MC, 2 October 1918 – 6 November 1918
Major A.F. Simpson, DSO, 6 November 1918 – 16 December 1918
Lieutenant-Colonel D.E. MacIntyre, DSO, MC, 16 December 1918-Demobilization

Battle Honours 
The 28th Battalion was awarded the following battle honours:

MOUNT SORREL
SOMME, 1916, '18
Flers-Courcelette
Thiepval
Ancre Heights
ARRAS, 1917, '18
Vimy, 1917
Scarpe, 1917, '18
HILL 70
Ypres 1917
Passchendaele
AMIENS
HINDENBURG LINE
Drocourt-Quéant
Canal du Nord
Cambrai, 1918
PURSUIT TO MONS
FRANCE AND FLANDERS, 1915-18

Perpetuation 
The perpetuation of the 28th Battalion was assigned in 1920 to 1st Battalion (28th Battalion, CEF), The South Saskatchewan Regiment, and has been passed down as follows:

 1st Battalion (28th Battalion, CEF), The South Saskatchewan Regiment: 1920–1924
 1st Battalion (28th Battalion, CEF), The Regina Rifle Regiment: 1924–1936
 The Regina Rifle Regiment: 1936–1982
 The Royal Regina Rifle Regiment: 1982–1984
 The Royal Regina Rifles: 1984–present

See also 

 List of infantry battalions in the Canadian Expeditionary Force

References

Sources

Canadian Expeditionary Force 1914-1919 by Col. G.W.L. Nicholson, CD, Queen's Printer, Ottawa, Ontario, 1962

028
Military units and formations of Ontario
Military units and formations of Saskatchewan
Royal Regina Rifles